Caesarea, a city name derived from the Roman title "Caesar", was the name of numerous cities and locations in the Roman Empire:

Places

In the Levant
 Caesarea Maritima, also known as "Caesarea Palaestinae", an ancient Roman city near the modern Israeli town
 Caesarea in Palaestina (diocese)
 Caesarea, Israel, official name Qeysarya, a modern town in Israel built near the site of ancient Caesarea Maritima
 Caesarea Philippi, an ancient city at Banias, at the foot of the Israeli-occupied southern slope of Munt Hermon, Syria
 Caesarea Magna, formerly Larissa in Syria, modern Shaizar, an ancient Roman city and modern Syrian town

In Turkey
 Caesarea in Cappadocia, modern Kayseri, an ancient Roman and modern Anatolian city
 Caesarea in Bithynia, alias Germanicopolis (in Bithynia), former bishopric and present Latin Catholic titular see
 Caesarea in Cilicia, renamed Anazarbus, an ancient Cilician and Roman city in modern Turkey
 Caesarea in Paphlagonia, renamed Hadrianopolis in modern Turkey
 Caesarea Antiochia, also known as "Antioch of Pisidia", an ancient Pisidian and Roman city 
 Caesarea Germanica, modern Kahramanmaraş in southern Turkey, an ancient Roman and Byzantine town
 Caesarea Cibyra, in southwest Anatolia, also named Kibyra

Elsewhere
 Kaisareia, Kozani in Macedonia

 Caesarea Mauretaniae, an ancient Roman-Berber city and former capital of Mauretania Caesariensis in modern-day Cherchell, Algeria
 Caesarea (island), modern Jersey, in the Channel Islands
 Nova Caesarea, the Latin name applied to the colony of New Jersey (now a US state), derived from the name of the island

Other uses 
 Kidon, a unit in the Mossad formerly named Caesarea
 Caesarea (novel), the third novel in The Pontypool Trilogy by Tony Burgess
 Caesarea (genus), a plant genus in the family Vivianiaceae

See also
 Caesariana
 Claudiocaesarea, modern Beyşehir, an ancient Roman city and modern Turkish town